This is a list of bypass highways in Nairobi, aimed at re-directing traffic away from the city center, thereby de-congesting the city and alleviating the perennial traffic jams.

 Nairobi Northern Bypass Highway, linking Limuru Road to Thika Road
 Nairobi Eastern Bypass Highway, linking Nairobi-Mombasa Road to Ruiru-Kiambu Road near Kamiti Maximum Security Prison.
 Nairobi Southern Bypass Highway, which starts at the junction of the Nairobi–Mombasa Road and Likoni Road, approximately 10 kilometres (6 mi) south-east of the city centre. It then stretches to Gitaru, in the town of  Kikuyu, in Kiambu County.
 Nairobi Western Bypass Highway, connects Gitaru, on the Southern Bypass to Ruaka on the Northern Bypass.

See also
 Thika Road
 List of roads in Kenya

References

External links
 Traffic Congestion Problems In Nairobi: An Examination of Uhuru Highway February 2009.

Roads in Kenya
Transport in Nairobi